Stian Kampenhaug Eckhoff (born 3 September 1979) is a former Norwegian biathlete. He has 2 World Cup victories and in the 2004–05 season, Eckhoff placed tenth overall. Since his retirement he has become involved in coaching the Norwegian national biathlon team, and was appointed head coach of the Norwegian women's biathlon programme ahead of the 2014–15 season. He is the brother of fellow biathlete Tiril Eckhoff.

Biathlon results
All results are sourced from the International Biathlon Union.

Olympic Games

World Championships
1 medal (1 gold)

*During Olympic seasons competitions are only held for those events not included in the Olympic program.
**The mixed relay was added as an event in 2005.

Individual victories
2 victories (2 Sp)

*Results are from UIPMB and IBU races which include the Biathlon World Cup, Biathlon World Championships and the Winter Olympic Games.

References

External links
 
 

1979 births
Living people
Sportspeople from Bærum
Norwegian male biathletes
Biathletes at the 2006 Winter Olympics
Olympic biathletes of Norway
Biathlon World Championships medalists
Cross-country skiing coaches
Norwegian sports coaches